Poblado is a station on line A of the Medellín Metro from north to south. It is named after El Poblado, where it is located adjacent to the Monterrey shopping center. The station was opened on 30 November 1995 as the terminus of the inaugural section of Line A, from Niquía to Poblado. On 30 September 1996 the line was extended to Itagüí.

References

External links
 Official site of Medellín Metro 

Medellín Metro stations
Railway stations opened in 1995
1995 establishments in Colombia